L.A. Tool & Die is a 1979 American gay pornographic film directed by Tim Kincaid, better known as Joe Gage. It is the concluding film in what has come to be known as Gage's "Working Man Trilogy", the first two being 1976's Kansas City Trucking Co. and 1978's El Paso Wrecking Corp.. It stars Richard Locke and features Will Seagers and Paul Barresi in a heterosexual scene with Becky Savage.

John Burger, the author of One-Handed Histories: The Eroto-Politics of Gay Male Video Pornography, describes the film as "the story of an unrequited love, in which Richard Locke follows the man of his dreams across the country. They eventually live happily ever after." Burger adds that this film came at the very end of the pre-AIDS filmmaking, when "all levels of erotic experience were faithfully documented by the porn industry... men could be whores, men could be monogamous or men could cruise the spectrum in between."

Reception 

L.A. Tool & Die was called "the best gay porn picture made to date" by Blueboy magazine.

Cast 

 Richard Locke as Hank
 Michael Kearns as Jim
 Joseph Kearns as Vic
 Richard Youngblood as Harry
 Will Seagers as Wylie
 Joe Walsh as Barry
 Calvin Culver as Fred (as Casey Donovan)
 Terri Dolan as Raven (as Terri Hannon)
 Derrick Stanton as The Stranger
 Shawn Victors as The Backpacker
 Paul Barresi as Sal (as Paul Baressi)
 Becky Savage as Elaine (as Becky Bitter)
 Johnny Falconberg as Pete
 Dan Pace as Coach
 Scott Sinclair as Mr. Carson
 Greg Dale as Windstorm Man (as Gregg Dale)

 Bob Damon as Windstorm Man
 Roy Harwood as Windstorm Man
 Bob Blount as Tank
 Chuck Cord as Gabe
 Matthew Forde as Jack
 Steve Rideout as Marine
 Reverend Spoonball as On the Radio (voice)
 Schutzen as Wylie's Dog
 Carlos Balajo
 Beau Lovejoy
 Tim Kincaid (as Joe Gage)
 Max Osterhaut
 Jose Solica
 Paul Guild
 Nels Stensgaard

DVD release 

The films comprising the "Working Man Trilogy" were restored and released on DVD by HIS Video.

References 

 Sources

External links 

 

1979 films
1970s pornographic films
American pornographic films
Films directed by Joe Gage (Tim Kincaid)
Gay pornographic films
1970s English-language films
1970s American films